Peter Deming,  (born December 13, 1957) is a Lebanese-born American cinematographer, known for his collaborations with directors like Sam Raimi, David Lynch, Wes Craven, and Jay Roach. He won the 2002 Independent Spirit Award for Best Cinematography for Mulholland Drive, and was nominated for a Primetime Emmy Award for his work on the third season of Twin Peaks.

Filmography

Film

Television

References

External links
Peter Deming at Movies.com

1957 births
American cinematographers
Independent Spirit Award winners
Living people
People from Racine, Wisconsin